The Deputy Assistant Secretary of the Navy for Research, Development, Test and Evaluation (DASN RDTE) serves as the principal adviser to the United States Assistant Secretary for Research, Development and Acquisition on all matters pertaining to Navy science, technology, advanced research and development programs; system prototype programs; and management of science and engineering.

The DASN monitors and coordinates with senior Naval officials among the various warfare centers and labs, including the Naval Research Laboratory; the Office of Naval Research; the Naval systems commands; and others in the Naval enterprise to facilitate advancement of technology systems into the fleet.

The current DASN (RDTE) is Joan Johnson.

References

External links
 DASN (RDTE) website

Office of the Secretary of the Navy